Collón Curá may refer to:

 Collón Curá River, a river in the Neuquén Province of northwestern Patagonia, Argentina
 Collón Curá Department, a department of the Neuquén Province
 Collón Curá Formation, a Miocene geologic formation of the Neuquén Province
 Colloncuran, a South American land mammal age named after the formation